The 13th Central American and Caribbean Age Group Championships in Athletics was hosted by the Bahamas Association of Athletic Associations (BAAA) on June 18–19, 2009. It was originally to be held in Freeport, Grand Bahama.  However, it had to be relocated to Nassau, New Providence, because the reconstruction of the stadium in Freeport could not be completed in time. This is already the third time, that the event is hosted by the Bahamas, after 1987 in Nassau, New Providence and 2001 in Freeport, Grand Bahama.

Participation

The competition results are published.

Although 20 teams were announced to participate, only 19 appeared in the listed results.  Athletes from Anguilla, Honduras, St. Vincent and the Grenadines, and Turks and Caicos Islands did not earn a medal.

Medal summary

Medal table (unofficial)

Team trophies

References

External links
Official CACAC Website
Official Championship Website

Central American and Caribbean Age Group Championships in Athletics
Central American and Caribbean Age Group Championships in Athletics
Central American and Caribbean Age Group Championships in Athletics
Age Group Championships in Athletics
Age Group Championships in Athletics
International athletics competitions hosted by the Bahamas
2009 in youth sport